William Joseph Dodd (November 25, 1909 – November 16, 1991) was an American politician who held five positions in the Louisiana state government in the mid-20th century, including state representative, lieutenant governor, state auditor, president and member of the State Board of Education, and state education superintendent.

Dodd died of cancer in Baton Rouge General Medical Center on the day of the Edwin Edwards-David Duke gubernatorial showdown. Memorial services were held at his home church, the Southside Baptist Church in Baton Rouge on November 18, 1991, with Dr. John Robson officiating.

References
 William J. "Bill" Dodd, Peapatch Politics: The Earl Long Era in Louisiana Politics, Baton Rouge: Claitors Publishing, 1991
 Who's Who in America, Vol. 34 (1966–1967)
 Shreveport Journal, March 6, 1970
 
 https://web.archive.org/web/20090703054258/http://cityofwinnfield.com/museum.html
 http://www.ferris.edu/HTMLS/OTHERSRV/isar/Institut/cca/touchstone_cca.htm
 "United States Social Security Death Index," database, FamilySearch (https://familysearch.org/ark:/61903/1:1:JRYB-H3X : 20 May 2014), William J Dodd, 16 Nov 1991; citing U.S. Social Security Administration, Death Master File, database (Alexandria, Virginia: National Technical Information Service, ongoing).

1909 births
1991 deaths
People from Allen Parish, Louisiana
People from Liberty, Texas
Educators from Louisiana
Military personnel from Texas
United States Army personnel of World War II
Baptists from Louisiana
Minor league baseball players
Louisiana lawyers
Lieutenant Governors of Louisiana
Comptrollers in the United States
Louisiana State Superintendents of Education
Louisiana State University alumni
Democratic Party members of the Louisiana House of Representatives
Northwestern State University alumni
Politicians from Baton Rouge, Louisiana
School board members in Louisiana
20th-century American memoirists
United States Army officers
Deaths from cancer in Louisiana
20th-century American lawyers
20th-century American politicians
People from Cody, Wyoming
20th-century Baptists